Bear Creek is a census-designated place (CDP) in Kenai Peninsula Borough, Alaska, United States. At the 2020 census the population was 2,129 up from 1,956 in 2010. Bear Creek is a few miles north of Seward near the stream of the same name and its source, Bear Lake.

Geography
Bear Creek is located at  (60.176060, -149.395066). It is bordered to the south by the city of Seward and to the north by Primrose. The CDP includes the unincorporated community of Woodrow, located at the south end of Bear Lake.

Alaska Route 9, the Seward Highway, runs the length of the Bear Creek community, leading south  to the center of Seward and north  to Alaska Route 1 at Tern Lake.

The southern border of the CDP is the Resurrection River to its outlet in Resurrection Bay. Bear Lake is in the center, draining south to the Resurrection. The CDP is bordered to the northeast by the South Fork of the Snow River, which flows north to Kenai Lake and is part of the Kenai River watershed flowing west to Cook Inlet.

Demographics

Bear Creek first appeared on the 2000 U.S. Census as a census-designated place (CDP).

At the 2000 census, there were 1,748 people, 686 households and 432 families residing in the CDP. There were 806 housing units at an average density of 19.2/sq mi (7.4/km2). The racial makeup of the CDP was 80.3% White, 0.3% Black or African American, 11.6% Native American, 1.0% Asian, 0.1% Pacific Islander, 1.0% from other races, and 5.6% from two or more races.  1.9% of the population were Hispanic or Latino of any race.

There were 686 households, of which 36.3% had children under the age of 18 living with them, 50.6% were married couples living together, 8.2% had a female householder with no husband present, and 37.0% were non-families. 26.1% of all households were made up of individuals, and 3.1% had someone living alone who was 65 years of age or older. The average household size was 2.55 and the average family size was 3.11.

28.4% of the population were under the age of 18, 6.2% from 18 to 24, 33.7% from 25 to 44, 26.4% from 45 to 64, and 5.3% who were 65 years of age or older. The median age was 37 years. For every 100 females, there were 119.0 males. For every 100 females age 18 and over, there were 122.6 males.

The median household income was $53,800 and the median family income was $57,167. Males had a median income of $37,339 and females $24,938. The per capita income was $20,947. About 2.0% of families and 5.0% of the population were below the poverty line, including 4.7% of those under age 18 and none of those age 65 or over.

References

Census-designated places in Kenai Peninsula Borough, Alaska
Census-designated places in Alaska